New Zealand's archaeology started in the early 1800s and was largely conducted by amateurs with little regard for meticulous study. However, starting slowly in the 1870s detailed research answered questions about human culture, that have international relevance and wide public interest. 

Archaeology has, along with oral traditions, defined New Zealand's prehistory and protohistory and has been a valuable aid in solving some later historical problems. Academically New Zealand's human prehistory is broadly divided into the periods of Archaic (~paleolithic then ~mesolithic after c. 1300 AD) and Classic (~neolithic) after c. 1500 AD, based on Māori culture. Eurasian labels do not perfectly fit as some level of horticulture was always present in northern New Zealand, even existing at the same time as megafauna. More simply it can also be divided into time periods of pre and post European contact. Large poorly documented sections of New Zealand's more recent history have also been supplemented by archaeological research, such as at old battle sites or early urban centres.

Debated questions in New Zealand's pre-contact archaeology 
Many questions about pre-contact New Zealand have been answered by archaeology and for most it is unlikely that new information will radically change our understanding. However some questions are still debated in the recent academic press in the hope that a new argument or data may bring resolution.

Date of first Māori arrival and settlement 
First attempts to date the arrival of Maori in New Zealand, by 19th-century scholars such as S. Percy Smith, were based on genealogies and oral histories, many of which – when assigned an average generation length of 25 years – converged on a settlement date around 1350 AD while others appeared to go back much further. This resulted in the classic theory, which all schoolchildren were once taught, that New Zealand had been discovered around 750 AD, then settled by later migrations, culminating in the "Great Fleet" of seven canoes around 1350 AD.

When radiocarbon dating started being used in the 1950s, it appeared to support the idea of early settlement, though the "Great Fleet" itself fell out of favour when scholars showed that there were inconsistencies in the genealogies that Smith had based his theory on. This was replaced by the idea of gradual settlement over many centuries which, itself, has turned out to be mistaken. In 1989, for example, changes in the New Zealand biota dated to about 1000 AD, were assumed to be linked to human settlement. However, by the mid-1990s, as radiocarbon dating methods were improved and sources of error better understood, it was realised that the early dates were not reliable and that the most reliable radiocarbon dates all pointed to a more recent first settlement, closer to 1300 CE or even later, In 1999, a sample from the Wairau Bar site gave a "late" age of 1230–1282 AD. which roughly coincided with charcoal and pollen evidence of forest fires that may or may not have been human-lit. The Wairau Bar settlement is known to be a first settler site because both its human remains and artefacts came from tropical Polynesia.

Against this emerging evidence for late settlement was some seemingly contradictory evidence from the first radiocarbon dating of ancient rat bones in 1996 which gave unusually early dates – as early as 10 AD – and led its author to suggest that rats had been brought here by early human voyagers who did not stay. Some scholars saw the early rat bone dates as confirmation of their theory that humans had settled in New Zealand even earlier than the classic theory had suggested, living in small numbers for a thousand years or so without leaving artefacts or skeletal remains.  However, further investigation found that those early rat bone results had been flawed, all coming from one laboratory during a limited time period, while all subsequent dating has found recent arrival times for both rats and humans. By 2008, there was little doubt that rats came to New Zealand with Māori no earlier than 1280 AD. This was confirmed in 2011 by a meta analysis of dates from throughout the Pacific which showed a sudden pulse of migration leading to all of New Zealand being settled (including the Chatham Islands) no earlier than c. 1290 AD.

While most researchers now use this late-13th-century date, others are revising it upward even further to around 1320 AD or later, based on new evidence from moa egg shells and from the Kaharoa eruption of Mount Tarawera (1314 ±6 AD), whose tephra forms a geological layer below all well-dated human and rat sites. Some researchers now conclude that the weight of all the radiocarbon and DNA evidence points to New Zealand having been settled rapidly in a mass migration sometime after the Tarawera eruption, somewhere in the decades between 1320 and 1350 CE – which suggests that the "Great Fleet" theory, and the genealogical calculations on which it was based, were not totally inaccurate after all.

Population growth rates 

The debate over Māori population size has two main areas of interest, how many settlers came to New Zealand and what was the population when European contact occurred. The second number is partly a historical question and estimated populations have not strayed far from Captain Cook's first estimate of 100,000, with some researches going up to 150,000. This number coupled with an inferred low growth rate has led researchers to require either a large founding population (more than 300 people) or an early settlement date (600–850 AD). Therefore, a date of c. 1300 AD requires a mass migration from tropical Polynesia, even though mitochondrial DNA implies a medium number of approximately 70 women settlers.

This story is further complicated by the South Island's slow growth rates throughout prehistory. This is because kumara was extremely difficult to grow in the South Island even during warm climatic periods. There is evidence that the "little ice age" affected New Zealand and caused a shrinking of the population. The extent of this cold period in New Zealand is unknown but it may have peaked in the early 18th century. By 1886 diseases like measles, war and disruption led to a Māori population of about 40,000 and 2000 in the North and South islands respectively.

Transitions in Māori culture 

Māori culture has been in constant adaptation to New Zealand's changing environment. From the late 1950s onward the term Archaic and Classic culture have been used to describe the early and late phases of pre-contact Māori.  Archaic replacing the older term "moa hunter" as the hunter-gatherer society lasted beyond the megafauna (as with Eurasia's Mesolithic).

The Archaic and Classic labels were intentionally chronological and not descriptive. They did not offer a definitive definition of either cultural period that could be used across time and space. Particularly in locations like the southern South Island where Classic tribes may migrate to regions where only an Archaic lifestyle was possible. Various transitional cultural artifacts and models have been proposed, however, there is still a dearth of evidence for a clear middle phase. Currently the Archaic culture is seen as semi nomadic hunter-gatherers with small gardens and populations, while the later Classic culture had large gardens and fortified permanent villages. Kumara cultivation was limited to the north until the Classic period, when building of storage pits and gardening methods allowed its storage over winter further south. In many sites in  New Zealand the absence of a middle phase or the constraint of only two options has led to other interpretations, including a sevenfold evolution of boom and bust cycles. Growing kumara would have been just possible in the north of the South Island during some climatic conditions.

Communication and migration 

As the early settlers to New Zealand came in great numbers with supplies for planting numerous crop types it is believed that it was a planned migration to a known location. However while there is some speculation from non archaeological sources that migration to New Zealand continued throughout the Archaic period, evidence is absent in the archaeological record, and there is also no evidence for domestic pigs and chickens from the Pacific making it to New Zealand - something would have been expected if trade networks had been built.

The Māori did, however, maintain the technology for long sea voyages – reaching the Chatham Islands in the 16th century.

The earliest archaeological sites in New Zealand have implements from tropical Polynesia. There is also evidence that obsidian was traded throughout New Zealand from soon after arrival. However it was only in the sixteenth century that pounamu (jade) was traded around New Zealand, with a different supply network to the obsidian. Earthquakes caused changing living patterns and the movement of people.

The Māori language has changed little in the 700 years since it separated from Cook Islands Māori.

Resource management in a new environment 
The ability of pre-contact Māori to manage resources and foresee ecological collapses has been the source of much debate. Natural fires were rare in New Zealand, yet much of the country was covered in dry forest, early Māori didn't protect fire‐prone areas and there is no evidence of systematic burning of less fire‐prone ones. Many New Zealand species may have been heading for slow extinction after Polynesian settlement. The extinction of the mega fauna (moa) seems to have occurred quickly, within 100 years. The first settlers came to New Zealand from tropical Polynesia and adapted to a temperate environment while preserving many of their old practices. Some conservative use of tropical Polynesian  methods lasted well into the Archaic period.

Historical archaeology 
Historical archaeology in New Zealand started late and grew slowly; it was only by the 1960s that European structures were being systematically excavated. One example is the evidence left by Taranaki Māori political prisoners who worked pounamu in the Dunedin jail in the late 1800s. there is also interest in the study of post-contact Māori sites.

History of archaeology 
Early archaeology in New Zealand  was performed by anthropologists and private collectors of Māori artifacts. Many sites were destroyed by careless scavenging or poorly documented research. Systematical research was first conducted by the museums from the main cities, followed by anthropology departments in the universities of Auckland and Otago. In 1955 the  New Zealand Archaeological Association was founded.

During this time in New Zealand the study of Māori oral tradition was more influential than archaeological techniques. The coming of the Māori "Great Fleet" to New Zealand was inferred to be in 1350 AD solely from traditional evidence (similar to modern estimates from carbon dating).

In the 21st century high resolution Landsat data was being used to interpret archaeological sites, although there was some doubt about the effectiveness of some modern tools. Archaeology departments conduct research from the university of Otago, Auckland and Canterbury. New Zealand archaeology is published in the Journal of Pacific Archaeology, the Journal of the Polynesian Society and in other international journals.

List of notable archaeological sites

Exceptional archaeological sites are included in the national register (administered by Heritage New Zealand) in five groups: historic places (Category 1 and 2), historic areas,  Wāhi Tūpuna (practical sites), Wāhi Tapu (spiritual sites) and Wahi Tapu areas. New Zealand has thousands of pre-contact sites, many of which are documented by the Historic Places Trust. Only a small fraction of these have detailed published archaeological reports. For example, in the South Island there are 550 rock art sites and 107 in the North Island and 6956 Pā in all New Zealand. The types of features present in New Zealand pre European archaeology are pā, storage pits, gardens (stone rows and banks), house floors, terraces, trenches, umu (earth ovens), middens, quarries, rock art and changes to the local flora.

See also
 Australian archaeology
 Archaeology of Samoa
 History of New Zealand 
 History of the Cook Islands
 Tahiti

References

 
Archaeological sites in New Zealand
History of New Zealand
Oceanian archaeology